The Hanselman sextuplets (born February 26, 2004) are a set of sextuplets born to Jennifer and Keith Hanselman in Akron, Ohio, United States.

Biography
The Hanselman sextuplets were born at Akron General Medical Center in Akron, Ohio on February 26, 2004, and are the first set of sextuplets to have been born in their state. Their parents, Jennifer and Keith Hanselman, live in Cuyahoga Falls, Ohio, and had a 2-year-old son at the time that the sextuplets were born. Jennifer, who formerly worked as an advertising copywriter, wrote a book about her experience of becoming a stay-at-home mother to seven young children in 2006, titled Party of Nine: The Triumphs and Traumas of Raising Sextuplets + One.

The Children
The Hanselman sextuplets, with their weight at birth, are:
Isabella Jean - 2 lb 10 oz
Sophia Ivy - 1 lb 9 oz
Kyle Allen - 2 lb 6 oz
Logan James - 2 lb 8 oz
Alex Edwin - 2 lb 8 oz
Lucy Arlene - 2 lb 1 oz

The first baby to be sent home was Lucy and the last was Sophia. Kyle was diagnosed with autism.

References

 "Woman Pregnant With Sextuplets Set To Give Birth." (February 23, 2004). NewsNet5.com. Retrieved July 5, 2007.
 "Sextuplets' Success Story." (March 2, 2005). CBS News. Retrieved June 5, 2007.
 Hale, David."Six plus one."  (July 1, 2007). The Albany Herald. Retrieved July 5, 2007.
 Robins, Monica. "Handling the Hanselman sextuplets." (November 9, 2004). WKYC.com. Retrieved July 5, 2007.
  Akron Children's Hospital. (March 2, 2005). "The Hanselman Sextuplets."  Retrieved July 5, 2007.
 Schnall, Sharon. "Party of Nine: Life with the Hanselman Sextuplets." (n.d.). Retrieved July 5, 2007.

External links 
Party of Nine official web site
Cleveland.com: The Hanselman sextuplets

2004 births
Living people
American children
Sextuplets
People from Cuyahoga Falls, Ohio